The canton of Marennes is an administrative division of the Charente-Maritime department, western France. Its borders were modified at the French canton reorganisation which came into effect in March 2015. Its seat is in Marennes-Hiers-Brouage.

It consists of the following communes:
 
Beaugeay
Bourcefranc-le-Chapus
Champagne
La Gripperie-Saint-Symphorien
Le Gua
Marennes-Hiers-Brouage
Moëze
Nieulle-sur-Seudre
Saint-Agnant
Saint-Froult
Saint-Jean-d'Angle
Saint-Just-Luzac
Saint-Sornin

References

Cantons of Charente-Maritime